Bolshevichka or Bolshevitchka (literally: "female Bolshevik") is a clothes factory in Moscow. It was launched on November 16, 1929. The current official name of the enterprise is  "Moscow Public Company 'Bolshevichka'" (Московское Открытое Акционерное Общество "БОЛЬШЕВИЧКА", or МОАО "Большевичка"). In 1966, it was awarded the Order of the Red Banner of Labour.

Bolshevichka was one of the largest manufacturers of menswear in the Soviet Union.

References

External links
Bolshevichka website 

Clothing companies of Russia
Manufacturing companies of the Soviet Union
Soviet brands
Manufacturing companies based in Moscow